Marcellini is an Italian surname. It may refer to
Antonio Marcellini (1937–2010), Italian football player
Luciana Marcellini (born 1948), Italian swimmer
Paolo Marcellini (born 1947), Italian mathematician
Romolo Marcellini (1910–1999), Italian film director and screenwriter
Siro Marcellini (born 1921), Italian film director